Taussac-la-Billière is a commune in the Hérault department in the Occitanie region in southern France.

Population

Personalities linked to the commune

Antoine Salles, village priest between 1747 and 1793, victim of the French Revolution in 1794.

See also
Communes of the Hérault department

References

Communes of Hérault